Cresol red (full name: o-cresolsulfonephthalein) is a triarylmethane dye frequently used for monitoring the pH in aquaria.

Molecular biology
Cresol red can be used in many common molecular biology reactions in place of other loading dyes. Cresol Red does not inhibit Taq polymerase to the same degree as other common loading dyes.

Color marker
Cresol red can also be used as an electrophoretic color marker to monitor the process of agarose gel electrophoresis and polyacrylamide gel electrophoresis. In a 1% agarose gel, it runs approximately at the size of a 125 base pair (bp) DNA molecule (it depends on the concentration of buffer and other component). Bromophenol blue and xylene cyanol can also be used for this purpose.

References

External links
 Cresol Red at OpenWetWare life scientists' wiki

Triarylmethane dyes
Phenol dyes
Benzoxathioles